Marie-Anne Pauline Du Mont, stage name Mademoiselle Lavoy (fl. 1739 – 1793), was a French stage actress. 

She was engaged at the Comédie-Française in 1734. She became a Sociétaires of the Comédie-Française in 1740. She retired in 1759. 

She played the confidants of heroines, secondary heroines and shared character parts with Mademoiselle de La Motte.

References

External links 
   Mademoiselle Lavoy, Comédie-Française

18th-century births
1793 deaths
18th-century French actresses
French stage actresses